= Hyperion Books =

Hyperion Books can refer to:

- Hachette Books, book publishing division formerly known as Hyperion Books
- Disney-Hyperion, an imprint that was retained by Disney Publishing Worldwide when its division, Hyperion Books, was sold to Hachette USA publishing group
- Hyperion Books for Children, a children's imprint that was retained by Disney Publishing Worldwide when its division, Hyperion Books, was sold to Hachette USA publishing group
